The War Medal 1873 was a military medal of Austria-Hungary established in 1873 and awarded for the occasion of Emperor Franz Joseph I. 25th anniversary of his reign and could be awarded to all military personnel of the Austro-Hungarian Armed Forces that took part in one or more campaigns in the years 1848, 1849, 1859, 1864, 1866, 1869, 1878, 1882, as well as in the military operations during the Chinese Boxer Rebelliones from 1900 to 1901, have participated.

History
The medal was  made from the bronze of captured guns shows. The obverse shows the head turned to the right of Emperor Franz Joseph I. Circumferential FRANZ JOSEPH I. EMPEROR OF AUSTRIA, KING OF BOHEMIA ETC. APOST. KING OF HUNGARY. The three-part inscription 2. DECEMBER 1873.

The ribbon is hatched horizontally in yellow and black, bordered by a black side stripe and finished with a yellow edge stripe. The award was worn on the triangular ribbon on the left breast.
During the First World War the medal was not awarded.

Endnotes

Orders, decorations, and medals of Austria-Hungary
Awards established in 1873